Reverend George Frederick Handel Elvey (29 June 1883 – 20 March 1967) was a croquet player from England. He was the youngest son of composer George Elvey and his fourth wife Mary née Savory.

Handel Elvey won the Doubles Championship in 1936 partnering his wife Nora and the Men's Championship of the South Of England in 1955.

As an administrator, Elvey served on the Council of the Croquet Association between 1931 and 1967, serving as Chairman (1939 to 1948) and Vice President (1952 to 1967).

Elvey spent most of his clerical life in the diocese of Chichester.

Works
 Croquet — A Handbook On The Strokes And Tactics Of The Game (John Jaques and Son, Ltd, 1949).

References

External links
The Croquet Records site

1883 births
1967 deaths
English croquet players